Pegar ou Largar ("to catch or to release" in Portuguese) is the Portuguese version of Deal or No Deal. It is produced by SIC and hosted by Rui Unas. It was premiered on January 28, 2006 according to the Internet Movie Database.

The set and format is similar to Miljoenenjacht (with 150 contestants compete in each episode), but the 26 cases are held by models, like the American version. The case values range from €0.01 to €300,000.

Case values

References

External links

Deal or No Deal
2006 Portuguese television series debuts
2006 Portuguese television series endings
2000s Portuguese television series